Foamhenge is a full-scale styrofoam replica of Stonehenge in Natural Bridge, Virginia. It was conceived and built by artist Mark Cline as a  roadside attraction, and opened on April 1, 2004. In 2017, Foamhenge was relocated to Centreville, Virginia.

Design and construction 

Foamhenge was created in 2004 by Mark Cline of Enchanted Castle Studios as an April Fool's Day stunt to generate tourism. The idea for Foamhenge came to Mark in 1998, when he was inspired by  foam blocks that he saw at a local insulation manufacturer. Mark had the concept and materials, but needed a location for his creation. In 2004, he made an agreement with The Natural Bridge for rent-free land with the intention of attracting tourists to both sites.

Foamhenge was designed to match Stonehenge, with similarly sized pieces oriented in astronomically equivalent coordinates. The 'stones' are composed completely of styrofoam and painted gray, weighing approximately 420 lbs. apiece.  They are stabilized with embedded  piping, extending from a concrete footing to the top of each stone. The entire structure was assembled in about ten days, as opposed to Stonehenge's construction period of about 1000 years.

Physical Decline and Move to Northern Virginia 
Foamhenge stayed at the Natural Bridge site for over 12 years. By 2015, the foam pieces had deteriorated markedly due to the temporary nature of its construction and overexposure to the elements in a moderate climate. Many of the pieces had fallen into disrepair to the point that they had split apart and held together with temporary supports.

The Natural Bridge became a state park in 2016, subsequently causing Foamhenge to close. The structure was dismantled on August 30, 2016, and placed in storage. After receiving over fifty inquiries from across the United States, Cline agreed to relocate Foamhenge to Cox Farms, a popular  family farm, near Centreville, VA, a suburb of  Washington, D.C. After the pieces were repaired and repainted, they were moved and re-constructed, with help from an astronomer, for permanent display at Cox Farms. Foamhenge re-opened in time for the start of the farm's "Fall Festival' on September 16, 2017.

Pop Culture 
Foamhenge was created as a whimsical, temporary, roadside attraction and architectural folly, but its popularity sustained its legitimacy and permanence. Foamhenge's quirkiness holds a certain appeal to a unique national subculture and it has become a must-see for many. Over time the attraction garnered the attention of many articles and television programs pertaining to American roadside attractions. In July, 2022, 'Big Potato Games''' announced that Foamhenge would be one of 49 popular national roadside attractions featured in "Zillionaires: Road Trip USA", its new Monopoly-style family board game. A photo of Foamhenge'' appears on the game's box.

See also
Stonehenge replicas and derivatives
Stonehenge
Roadside attraction
Natural Bridge

References

External links

Landmarks in Virginia
Roadside attractions in Virginia
Buildings and structures in Rockbridge County, Virginia
Tourist attractions in Rockbridge County, Virginia
Stonehenge replicas and derivatives
2004 sculptures
Polystyrene sculptures
Relocated buildings and structures in Virginia